Chericoke is a historic home and national historic district located near Falls in King William County, Virginia. It was built by Carter Braxton (a Founding Father of the United States and signer of the Declaration of Independence) in 1767.  Located several miles northwest of his family's estate of Elsing Green, Chericoke served as Braxton's home from 1767 to 1786. Braxton is believed to have been buried in the adjoining family cemetery shortly after his death in 1797. The structure was rebuilt in brick  in the Federal style by his grandson Dr. Corbin Braxton in 1828.

It was listed on the National Register of Historic Places in 1980.

References

External links
 National Park Service Biography on Carter Braxton

Houses on the National Register of Historic Places in Virginia
Georgian architecture in Virginia
Federal architecture in Virginia
Braxton family of Virginia
Carter family residences
Houses in King William County, Virginia
Houses completed in 1767
National Register of Historic Places in King William County, Virginia
Historic districts on the National Register of Historic Places in Virginia
1767 establishments in Virginia
Homes of United States Founding Fathers